The 2012 Campeonato Estadual da Serie A de Profissionais do Rio de Janeiro was the 111th edition of football in Rio de Janeiro. It was organized by the Federação de Futebol do Estado do Rio de Janeiro (FERJ).

Fluminense won the title against Botafogo.

Format
The sixteen clubs were divided into two groups that would play in two tournaments. In the first tournament, Taça Guanabara, the teams from each group played within their group in a single round-robin tournament. The two top place teams from each group advanced to the playoffs and the next two top place teams played for the Troféu Washington Rodrigues. In the second tournament, Taça Rio, the teams play against the teams in the other group in a single round-robin format.  The two best teams from each group advanced to the playoffs and next placed two teams played the Troféu Carlos Alberto Torres. Each top team of Taça Guanabara and Taça Rio played for the state title. If the same team wins both tournament, they automatically were awarded the title.

Qualifications
The best two teams not qualified to 2013 Copa Libertadores would qualify for 2013 Copa do Brasil. The best team not playing in Campeonato Brasileiro Série A, B, or C qualified for 2012 Campeonato Brasileiro Série D

Participating teams

Taça Guanabara
The 2012 Taça Guanabara began on January 21 and ended on February 26.

Group stage

Group A

Group B

Troféu Edilson Silva

Knockout stage

Taça Rio

Group stage

Group A

Group B

Troféu Luiz Penido

Knockout stage

Finals

The 2012 Campeonato Carioca Finals were contested by Fluminense and Botafogo in a two-legged match at the Estádio Olímpico João Havelange.

Overall standings

References

Campeonato Carioca seasons
Carioca